MegaMan NT Warrior, known in Japan as , is a Japanese manga series written and illustrated by Ryo Takamisaki. It was originally serialized in Shogakukan's monthly magazine, CoroCoro Comic. Its individual chapters were later into thirteen Tankōbon volumes released between July 2001 and November 2006. Viz Media licensed and released the thirteen volumes between May 2004 and February 2008. The series is based on the Mega Man Battle Network video game series and has also been adapted into an anime series by Xebec. The plot takes place in a futuristic world and follows Lan Hikari and his NetNavi, a personal artificial intelligent being that resides in a device called a PET, MegaMan as they encounter the cyber-terrorist group the World Three.



Volume list

References

MegaMan NT Warrior
Mega Man Battle Network